John Martin (17 May 1868 – 27 June 1951) was a British sports shooter. He competed at the 1908 Summer Olympics winning a silver medal in the team military rifle event.

His brother Alex Martin represented Canada at the same Olympics and his son Alexander Martin competed for Great Britain at the 1924 Olympics.

References

1868 births
1951 deaths
British male sport shooters
Olympic shooters of Great Britain
Shooters at the 1908 Summer Olympics
Olympic silver medallists for Great Britain
Olympic medalists in shooting
Medalists at the 1908 Summer Olympics
Place of birth missing